Delamere is a village and former civil parish, now in the parish of Delamere and Oakmere, in the county of Cheshire, England. The population of the civil parish taken at the 2011 census was 1,025. The name of the village comes from the French de la mer "of the sea". The civil parish was abolished in 2015 to form Delamere and Oakmere; parts also went to Kelsall, Utkinton and Cotebrook and Willington.

The civil parish was well known for the Delamere Forest, an expanse of oak, pine and sycamore trees which forms the largest woodland in Cheshire. It includes the hills of Old Pale and Eddisbury Hill, part of the Mid Cheshire Ridge.

There are several cafés, including the Station House Café at Delamere railway station and Delamere Café in Delamere Forest. Other services include a primary school (Delamere C of E Academy), shop (Delamere Stores), community centre and public house, the Vale Royal Abbey Arms on the A556.

Transport
Delamere is served by Delamere railway station which opened on 22 June 1870. There are regular stopping services to both Chester and Manchester Piccadilly

Geodesy
On Pale Heights (National Grid ) was the origin (meridian) of the first Ordnance Survey one inch mapping of the whole of the United Kingdom.

Notable people
Alan Mayers (b. 1937), English footballer
Henry Wilbraham (1825–1883), English mathematician

See also

Listed buildings in Delamere, Cheshire
St Peter's Church, Delamere

References

External links

Villages in Cheshire
Former civil parishes in Cheshire
Cheshire West and Chester